Blue Springs is a city located in the U.S. state of Missouri within Jackson County. Blue Springs is the 9th largest city in the Kansas City Metropolitan Area and 10th largest city in the state of Missouri. As of the 2020 census, the population was 58,604, and per the United States Census of estimates from July 2021 the population of Blue Springs is 59,430.

History 

Blue Springs’ history is tied to the migration of settlers on their westward journey. Pioneers found the area to be an ideal stopover due to the abundance of cool, clean water from a spring of the Little Blue River—hence the name Blue Springs. The presence of water and a need for pioneer supplies led to the construction of a grist mill and permanent settlement at the current site of the City's Burrus Old Mill Park on Woods Chapel Road.

An early settler, Franklin Smith, arrived in Blue Springs from Virginia in 1838 and became a leading figure in the community's development. He established the first post office in 1845, naming it after the well-known springs.

The settlement continued to grow near the springs until March 1878, when the Chicago and Alton Railroad announced plans to build a station about one mile east of the original settlement. To take advantage of the commerce the railroad would bring, the town moved its center to the site of the new station and continued its development as a rural trading center.  The Jackson County Court granted the incorpation of Blue Springs on September 7, 1880, making the City the fourth settlement in the county to be incorporated. The Chicago & Alton Hotel built in 1878, located on Main Street west of the railroad tracks is the oldest business in the City of Blue Springs.

Historical attractions near or in Blue Springs include: Missouri Town 1855, Fort Osage National Historic Landmark, Dillingham-Lewis House Museum, Chicago & Alton Hotel Museum, and the Lone Jack Civil War Museum.

City Hall History

Until 1965, the Blue Springs City Hall was located in a very small block building under the old water tower on the northwest corner of 11th and Walnut Streets.  City Hall and the water tower were torn down not long after vacating the buildings. From 1965 to 1968, the City Hall was a metal building located in the 200 block of NW 11th Street, across the street from the former Blue Springs Post Office.  In 1968 the current City Hall was built at 903 W. Main Street as the Blue Springs Municipal Building.  The Blue Springs Municipal Building held the Blue Springs Police Department in the lower level and city hall functions on the main level until 1988, when the Police Department moved to a new police station at 1100 SW Smith Street.  The Municipal Building was remodeled in 1989 and was renamed the Blue Springs City Hall.

The June 1911 issue of Technical World magazine published an article claiming that Blue Springs "boasts of possessing the world's champion marble players," and published a picture of a competition. It named Dan Stanley, George Webb, George Binger and Lynn Pryor as the best.

In 2010, CNN/Money Magazine ranked Blue Springs 49th on its list of the 100 Best Places to Live in the United States.

On May 24, 2012, Chris Oberholtz and Dave Jordan of KCTV5 reported that several residents had seen strange lights in the evening sky above Blue Springs.

Past Mayors of Blue Springs
1881 John A. Webb (Deceased) elected first mayor of Blue Springs
Term Unknown John K. Dodson (Deceased)
Term Unknown D.C. Herrinton (Deceased)
1910-1918 Benjamin Franklin Boley (Deceased)
1918-1924 Joseph Edward Quinn (Deceased)
1924-1940 R.J. Lowe (Deceased)
1940-1944 J.L. Wells (Deceased)
1944-1948 Hansel Lowe (Deceased)
1948-1950 W.E. Calloway (Deceased)
1950-1952 G.G. "Chief" Garrett (Deceased)
1952-1954 W.C. Hatfield (Deceased)
1954-1955 W.E. Galloway (Deceased)
1955-1956 G.G. "Chief" Garrett (Deceased)
1956-1958 Wilson P. Edmonds (Deceased)
1958-1960 William H. Risler (Deceased)
1960-1962 G.G. "Chief" Garrett (Deceased)
1962-1966 J.O. Jackson (Deceased)
1966-1970 Virgil L. Wills (Deceased)
1970-1978 Dale Baumgardner (Deceased)
1979-1982 Thomas E. Woods
1982-1990 John R. Michael
1990-2004 Gregory Grounds
2004-2008 Steve Steiner
2008–Present Carson Ross

Geography 
Blue Springs is located at  (39.017778, -94.274444).

Demographics

2010 census
As of the census of 2010, there were 52,575 people, 19,522 households, and 14,468 families residing in the city. The racial makeup of the city was 87.6% White, 6.2% African American, 0.5% Native American, 1.2% Asian, 0.2% Pacific Islander, 1.3% from other races, and 3.1% from two or more races. Hispanic or Latino of any race were 5.0% of the population.

There were 19,522 households, of which 40.4% had children under the age of 18 living with them, 55.3% were married couples living together, 13.7% had a female householder with no husband present, 5.1% had a male householder with no wife present, and 25.9% were non-families. 20.4% of all households were made up of individuals, and 5.8% had someone living alone who was 65 years of age or older. The average household size was 2.68 and the average family size was 3.09.

The median age in the city was 34.7 years. 27.9% of residents were under the age of 18; 8.6% were between the ages of 18 and 24; 27.8% were from 25 to 44; 26.4% were from 45 to 64; and 9.4% were 65 years of age or older. The gender makeup of the city was 48.5% male and 51.5% female.

2000 census
, there were 48,080 people, 17,286 households, and 13,362 families residing in the city. The racial makeup of the city was 93.18% White, 2.93% African American, 0.43% Native American, 0.97% Asian, 0.11% Pacific Islander, 0.83% from other races, and 1.55% from two or more races. Hispanic or Latino of any race were 2.76% of the population.

There were 17,286 households, out of which 42.5% had children under the age of 18 living with them, 63.1% were married couples living together, 10.5% had a female householder with no husband present, and 22.7% were non-families. 18.1% of all households were made up of individuals, and 4.8% had someone living alone who was 65 years of age or older. The average household size was 2.77 and the average family size was 3.16.  In the city the population was spread out, with 29.5% under the age of 18, 8.7% from 18 to 24, 31.9% from 25 to 44, 22.8% from 45 to 64, and 7.1% who were 65 years of age or older. The median age was 33 years. For every 100 females, there were 95.8 males. For every 100 females age 18 and over, there were 92.3 males.  The median income for a household in the city was $55,402, and the median income for a family was $61,008. Males had a median income of $41,373 versus $29,688 for females. The per capita income for the city was $23,444. About 3.9% of families and 4.8% of the population were below the poverty line, including 6.0% of those under age 18 and 5.9% of those age 65 or over.

Economy

Top employers
According to the town's 2016 Comprehensive Annual Financial Report, the top employers in the city are:

Government
The City of Blue Springs has a Mayor-Council-Administrator form of government as set forth in the Home Rule City Charter. The City Council is the governing body of the City, elected by the public.  The City of Blue Springs employs a workforce of more than 285 employees who serve the City and its residents under the leadership and direction of the City Administrator. The City Administrator is appointed by the City Council and is responsible for the implementation of policies and decisions made by the Mayor and City Council.  The elected governing body for the City of Blue Springs is composed of a Mayor and six Councilpersons.  The current elected officials are: Mayor Carson Ross, District 1 Councilman Dale Carter, District 1 Councilman Jerry Kaylor, District 2 Councilman Chris Lievsay, District 2 Councilman Kent Edmondson, District 3 Councilman Susan Culpepper, District 3 Councilman Ron Fowler.

Public safety
Blue Springs has a Municipal Police Department.  The Blue Springs School District has a department of public safety. There are two Fire Districts providing public safety services to resident's Blue Springs.
Blue Springs Law Enforcement duties are performed by the Blue Springs Police Department. B.S.P.D. was formed by the City of Blue Springs in 1966 and started with just three employees.  Today (BSPD) has grown to 138 employees, 100 sworn law enforcement personnel and 38 civilian support personnel.  (BSPD) is located at 1100 SW Smith Street.
Fire and ambulance service for most of Blue Springs is performed by Central Jackson County Fire Protection District(CJCFPD). CJC was formed in 1961 and is an Accredited Fire Agency by the Commission on Fire Accreditation International.  It is 1 of only 4 agencies in the state of Missouri to be accredited.  CJCFPD has 5 fire stations that serve the community.  CJCFPD Headquarters is located at 805 NE Jefferson St.
Fire and ambulance service for the very southern portion of Blue Springs, roughly south of Liggett Road, is served by Prairie Township Fire Protection District (PTFD) which was established in 1954 and has 1 fire station to serve the community located in unincorporated Jackson County at 11010 Milton Thompson Road.
The Blue Springs School District Department of Public Safety (BSSD DPS) has 14 commissioned officers and an administrative assistant which serves as the departments dispatcher, records keeper, and public face of the department to the customers.  The commissioned officers service the schools as School Resource Officers (SRO), providing public safety classes to students and staff members, and conduct residency/truancy investigations.  BSSD DPS is located at the Paul Consiglio Education Center at 1501 NW Jefferson Street in Blue Springs.

Transportation 
 The Kansas City Area Transportation Authority, KCATA provides public bus services to Blue Springs.

Major highways and roadways
  Interstate 70 - Major east/west interstate highway, connecting Blue Springs to Kansas City, Columbia, and St. Louis
  US 40 -Connects Kansas City to Independence and then enters Blue Springs at Bolin Road to the west, then east of Adams Dairy Parkway enters Grain Valley.
  Route 7 - Links U.S. 24 Hwy with Blue Springs by first traveling through Independence entering Blue Springs at Pink Hill Road and is the main north/south Highway through Blue Springs, leaving Blue Springs at Colbern Road and entering Lake Lotawana then Pleasant Hill and Harrisonville.
 Adams Dairy Parkway is an important trafficway that runs from the north to south through Blue Springs.

Culture/parks and recreation
Fleming Park is home to Blue Springs Lake and Lake Jacomo. The park is operated by Jackson County. Fleming Park offers many recreational features.

Blue Springs also has 22 city parks which offer a vast array of recreational activities. They are:
Adams Pointe Golf Course
Baumgardner Park
Blue Springs Park
Burrus Old Mill Park
Burrus Old Mill Skate Parks
Central Park
Dog Park at Gregory O. Grounds Park
Franklin Smith School Park
Gregory O. Grounds Park
Hidden Valley Sports Complex
James Walker School Park
James Walker Skate Park
Keystone Park
Pink Hill Park
Rotary Park at Railroad Lake
Ward Park
Wilbur Young Park
Wood Chapel Park
Undeveloped Parks or Green Spaces without amenities include the following:
Northeast Park Site, Valley View Park, Stone Creek Park, and Rosco Righter Park.

Blue Springs City owned or ran recreational facilities are:
Centennial Pool Plex
Vesper Hall

Private clubs or organizations
 Blue Springs Country Club
 Elks Lodge #2509
 The American Legion Stanley-Pack
 Metro East Tennis Center
 Blue Springs Lodge #337 AF & AM

Newspapers
 The Examiner, Eastern Jackson County Daily Newspaper.  Also known as the Blue Springs Examiner
 The Kansas City Star

Education
Blue Springs is served by three public schools districts and three private schools.  Public Schools are as follows: 
Blue Springs R-IV School District, has two high schools, which are Blue Springs High School and Blue Springs South High School, as well as a Freshmen Center.
Lee's Summit R-VII School District, has three high schools, but the only one that serves Blue Springs and it is Lee's Summit North High School.
Grain Valley R-V School District, has one high school, which is Grain Valley High School.
The private schools are as follows:
Timothy Lutheran Schools, K-8, North Campus
St. John La Lande Catholic School, K-8
Plaza Heights Christian Academy, PreK-12

Climate
Blue Springs experiences a colder variation of a four-season humid subtropical climate (Köppen climate classification Cfa) with mild days and cold nights during the winter, and hot days and muggy nights during the summer.

Infrastructure

Utilities
Blue Springs is served by the following utilities:
 Natural Gas Service- Spire Inc.
 Electrical Service-Kansas City Power and Light, KC&PL—a division of Evergy.
 Water & Sewer Service-City of Blue Springs Missouri supplies most of water to Blue Springs and sewer service to the entire city.
 Water Service Only-Jackson County Public Water Supply District #13 is the supplier of water for the southernmost portion of Blue Springs.
 Cable Television-Comcast Cable, and AT&T U-verse
 Telephone Service-AT&T, and Embarq south of Mason School Road.

Hospital
St. Mary's Medical Center

Public libraries
Mid-Continent Public Library operates two library branches in Blue Springs

Notable people

Sports
 Doug Terry - Former NFL player for the Kansas City Chiefs
 Ladell Betts - Former NFL player for the Washington Redskins and the New Orleans Saints
 Donald Stephenson - Former NFL player for the Kansas City Chiefs, Denver Broncos, and the Cleveland Browns
Jimmy Redmond - Former NFL player for the Jacksonville Jaguars
 Brandon Lloyd - NFL player for San Francisco 49ers
 Khalil Davis - NFL player for the Tampa Bay Buccaneers
 Carlos Davis - NFL player for the Pittsburgh Steelers
 Darrius Shepherd - NFL player for the Green Bay Packers
 Elijah Lee - NFL player for the Detroit Lions
 Deiondre' Hall - NFL player for the Tampa Bay Buccaneers
 Jim Eisenreich - Former MLB player for Twins, Royals, Phillies, and Marlins and 1997 World Series champion
 Nick Tepesch - MLB player for the Texas Rangers, Los Angeles Dodgers, Minnesota Twins, and Toronto Blue Jays. 
 Terry Gautreaux - Taekwondo, bronze medalist in 1992 Summer Olympics
 Steve Harris - NBA player and University of Tulsa basketball standout
 Jon Sundvold - NBA player and University of Missouri basketball standout
 Jeff Mittie - women's basketball head coach, Kansas State
 Ivana Hong - alternate Olympic gymnast, Beijing 2008
 Terin Humphrey - Olympic gymnast, Athens 2004
 Tonya Knight - IFBB professional bodybuilder
 Courtney McCool - Olympic gymnast, Athens 2004
 Josh Watson - NFL Player for the Carolina Panthers
 Justin Pitts - Professional Basketball player for HLA Alicante of the Spanish LEB Plata.
Kendall Blanton - NFL Player for the Los Angeles Rams

Entertainment
 David Cook - winner of American Idol Season 7

References

External links
 
 City of Blue Springs Official City Website
 Historic maps of Blue Springs in the Sanborn Maps of Missouri Collection  at the University of Missouri

Cities in Jackson County, Missouri
Cities in Kansas City metropolitan area
Populated places established in 1880
1880 establishments in Missouri
Cities in Missouri